Miami Edison High School is a secondary school located at 6161 NW 5 Ct. in the Little Haiti neighborhood of Miami, Florida, United States. It is part of the Miami-Dade County Public Schools system. Its provost is Leon Maycock.

Miami Edison is an inner-city school. , it is known for historically having the largest Haitian-American student population of any Miami-Dade public school.

History

Miami Edison Senior High School had its humble beginnings in a small palmetto-thatched hut inhabited by spiders, beetles, 10 pupils, and one teacher. After this tropical edifice burned to the ground in 1895, the activities were moved twice, finally being established in a rickety, four-room structure in 1897. During the brief tenure of Principal Ernest Roller, only the common subjects and agriculture were taught. At this time, the forerunner of the Parent Teacher Association, the "Mother's and Teacher's League" was formed; its aim was to further the general welfare of the student body. This organization became the oldest PTA of service in Dade County when the name was changed in 1918.

In 1915, after the destruction of the old building by a violent windstorm, the long-cherished dream of Dr. J. G. DuPuis, A. N. Fallensen, and E. N. Webb, trustees, was realized as Dade County Agricultural High School came into existence. Mainly through their efforts, a land grant was secured and the new building was erected. Professor A. C. Alleshouse became principal in 1917, and was succeeded in 1920 by W. O. Lockhart. Being accredited by the Southern Association of Colleges and Secondary Schools made it necessary to secure a principal with a degree;  J. N McArthur became principal until his transfer in 1923, when Jesse G. Fisher accepted the position. Even in these years of instability, the school continued to grow, as two wings were added in 1922 and five years later the first cafeteria was installed. Many school organizations came into being at this time to keep pace with the extension of the building. This rapid growth continued as the impetus given to athletics by the employment of the first regular coach brought the clamor for a gymnasium. The school board proceeded to erect the addition, but due to lack of an architect, the bleachers soon became the victim of the hurricane of 1936. The repaired building remained until the present middle school was constructed on the site.

In 1928, the present building was completed and into it moved 892 students and a faculty of 32, marking the beginning of the junior and senior high system. New additions included the Home Economics building, and the only boat-building class in the United States. In the following years, the school auditorium, the shops and the field house were added. In 1931 came a strong demand to change the school's name. Under the influence of Principal Fisher and Henry Filer, then chairman of the school board, suggested names were submitted to the student body. The recent death of America's great inventor, Thomas A. Edison, proved to be the deciding factor.

Thus, in October 1931, Dade County Agricultural High became Miami Edison Senior High in his honor. Soon after, this new name was immortalized as Frances Deen set to music the words of Marjorie Weatherup's "Alma Mater". In 1949, at the death of Julian Daniel, his great character, service, and leadership were honored by the establishment of the Julian Daniel Award and by the presentation of Key Club's annual scholarship. Robert A. Wilson became principal upon Fisher's retirement in 1950, and under his leadership, the extracurricular program was expanded.

Interested not only in academics, Miami Edison has for years also earned the reputation of being recognized a leader in all fields of athletics. The Red Raiders have shown their superiority in football, for they often dominated the strongest league in Florida, the Big Ten Conference. The varsity is proud of the fact that the Orange Bowl Stadium was dedicated by an Edison team playing Coral Gables in 1938, and has since remained the home of the Red Raiders. The pride and spirit of the students in all endeavors were shown when a strong Student Council and Inter-Club Council were organized in the 1930s. Through their efforts, the Honor Code, regarded as the basis of the "Edison spirit", was adopted in 1939. The Miami Edison "Red Raiders" symbol was originally a human skull with crossbones below it. The Coat of Arms was installed in the patio in 1958 and the "Little Red Devil" replaced the skull and crossbones as the symbol of their spirit.

In 1955, William B. Duncan became principal and has been able, through the efforts of an outstanding faculty, the support of community resources, and the motivation of the students, to set in motion those changes emphasized in the nation for a rededication to quality education for every student according to his ability. During his administration, the "Operation Amigo" program found its beginning in the United States in the halls of Miami Edison in January 1962. The chance to take in Peruvian students in cooperation with the Miami Herald was a complete success. For the prominent part Edison played in this now nationwide program in hemispheric understanding, Duncan became the first North American to be awarded the "Alfonso Ugarte" medal for intercultural friendship.

Thus, from humble beginnings in 1885 to the advent of a prominent high school in 1915, Edison has expanded from a tiny thatched hut to a present extensive structure; from a faculty of one to over 100; from a student body of 10 to over 2200; and from a school of agriculture to one with diversified courses. The prevailing school spirit, standards of integrity, and ideals of scholarship and sportsmanship have reigned supreme throughout the years. These ideals of Miami Edison have helped to mold many outstanding personalities, but no man lives without leaving his mark in some way, and Miami Edison is rich in all these - her sons, daughters, and those who cherish her name.

After 1964,
Miami Edison Senior High has seen many changes in recent years. Reflecting the population shifts of the region, Edison went from having a predominantly white student body in the early 1960s to an almost completely African-American one by the time the senior high moved to its present building in 1979. The 1980s had a further shift in population, with the influx of Haitians making the present student body predominantly Haitian-American.

No more principals have been like Jesse Fisher, who stayed at Edison almost 30 years (1923–1950), or William Duncan, who lasted almost 20 (1955–1973). Most Edison principals now stay for 3–5 years (as is the case district-wide). Following Duncan, the school had these principals: Judith Greene (1973–1977), Piedad Bucholtz (1977–1979), Frank deVarona (1979–1983), Craig Sturgeon (1983–1992), Willa Young (1992–1995), Gloria Evans (1995–1998), and the current principal, Santiago C. Corrada.

The Haitian students coming to Miami-Dade County during the 1980s and 1990s were mostly low-income, and high school-aged students generally attended Miami Edison High School.

Because of overcrowding, two new wings (S and T) and a legion of portables have been added over the years.  The mascot has changed again. The Little Devil is out, making way for the Pirate, for which students and staff voted during the 1997-98 school year. Edison students are still great achievers in sports. The girls' basketball team won the state championship in 1995 and 2001.

After the 2010 Haiti earthquake occurred, the MDCPS expected a large influx of students to Miami Edison. Ultimately, only six earthquake survivors enrolled there, with other students enrolling at other high schools.

Notable alumni

Pete Athas - former NFL player
Warren Bryant - former NFL player
William Laws Calley Jr - U.S. Army officer convicted for My Lai Massacre
Randy Christmas - mayor of Miami (1955–1957)
Midre Cummings, class of 1990 - Major League Baseball player with numerous teams, primarily Pittsburgh Pirates and Minnesota Twins
Al Darby - former NFL player
Marie Ferdinand-Harris - WNBA player
Keith Ferguson - former NFL player for the San Diego Chargers and Detroit Lions
Sylvia Fowles - WNBA basketball player (2015 WNBA Finals MVP) and Olympic gold medalist at the 2008 Beijing Olympics (transferred to Gulliver Preparatory)
Jasper Howard - football player for the University of Connecticut Huskies
William Joseph -  former NFL first-round pick and current defensive tackle for the Oakland Raiders
Larry Libertore - college football player, businessman, and Florida state legislator
Thomas Mattingly - astronaut, flew on Apollo 16, STS-4, and STS 51-C
John Mica - Congressman
Tangi Miller - actress on Felicity, Tyler Perry's Family Reunion
Nat Moore - former NFL wide receiver for the Miami Dolphins
Mary Rountree - baseball player
Oteman Sampson - football player
E. Clay Shaw Jr. - Florida Congressman
Jackie Simpson - former NFL player for the Baltimore Colts and Pittsburgh Steelers

Demographics
As of 2008, the school had 1,150 students. 240 of them were taking English as a second language classes, with the majority of them having Haitian Creole as their primary language.

Academics 
The state's accountability program grades a school by a complex formula that looks at both current scores and annual improvement on the reading, math, writing, and science FCATs.

The school's grades by year since the FCAT began in 1998 are:

 1998-99: F
 1999-00: D
 2000-01: D
 2001-02: F
 2002-03: F
 2003-04: F
 2004-05: F
 2005-06: F
 2006-07: D
 2007-08: F
 2009-10: C

News
In 2001, Leadership Miami and the Inner City Youth Center Miami Youth Center enlisted noted area abstract artist Antonia Gerstacker to organize area youth to help paint an inspirational mural facing the school's sports grounds.

In response to an arrest made on 29 February 2008, a riot broke out the following day (Friday). Miami-Dade Police, Miami-Dade County School Police, and Florida Highway Patrol officials reported to the scene.

See also
Miami Edison Middle School
Education in the United States

References

External links

Miami Edison Senior High School

Miami Edison High's Greatschools page
Miami-Dade County public schools

Miami-Dade County Public Schools high schools
High schools in Miami